Louis Pérouas (9 September 1923, in Rennes – February 2011, in Limoges) was a French historian, a specialist in the history of the French Catholic Church.

Ordained a priest in 1949, he became a missionary of the Society of Mary. He pursued postgraduate studies in history at the University of Lille and joined the CNRS in 1962 as a researcher and then research director working in Limoges in connection with the Department of History of the University of Limoges.

Main works and publications 
1964: Le diocèse de La Rochelle de 1648 à 1724, sociologie et pastorale, SEVPEN, 532 pages
1985: Refus d'une religion, religion d'un refus, en Limousin rural, 1880-1940, Éd de l'École des hautes études en sciences sociales
1988: La Révolution française, une rupture dans le christianisme ?, le cas du Limousin, 1775-1822, Éd Les Monédières
1989: Grignion de Montfort et la Vendée, Éditions du Cerf
1993: Une religion des Limousins ? approches historiques, L'Harmattan
1994: Histoire religieuse des Creusois, Société des sciences naturelles et archéologiques de la Creuse
1996: Claude et ses frères, Éd Don Bosco
1996: Prêtres ouvriers à Limoges : des trajectoires constratées, L'Harmattan
2002: Culte des saints et anticléricalisme : entre statistiques et culture populaire, Musée du Pays d'Ussel
2003: L'Église au prisme de l'histoire : regards sur un demi-siècle de recherches et d'engagements, L'Harmattan
2005: Lettre ouverte à des amis francs-maçons, Éd Les Monédières

External links 
 Louis Pérouas. Le diocèse de La Rochelle de 1648 à 1724. Sociologie et pastorale on Persée
 Louis Perouas on S.S.N.A.H.C.
 Louis Perouas, Gabriel Deshayes. Un grand pionnier de la restauration catholique dans l’Ouest de la France (1767-1841)
 PÉROUAS (Louis). – Gabriel Deshayes. Un grand pionnier de la Restauration catholique dans l’Ouest de la France (1767-1841) on Histoire de l'éducation
 Louis Pérouas, Michel Laguionie, Roger Mariglier, Franc-Maçonnerie et antimaçonnisme en Limousin, amorces d’un dialogue on assr.revues.org

1923 births
Writers from Rennes
2011 deaths
20th-century French historians
21st-century French historians
French historians of religion
20th-century French male writers
21st-century French male writers
French male non-fiction writers
Research directors of the French National Centre for Scientific Research